Rosemary McGrotha (born November 8, 1958 in Tallahassee, Florida, United States) is an American fashion model. A reoccurring model in Donna Karan's work, McGrotha appears in almost all of the Karan ads. She was in a popular ad campaign for Donna Karan in 1992 called "In Women We Trust" where she portrayed a woman who was President of the United States.

References

External links

Elle cover and interview

1958 births
Living people
Female models from Florida
21st-century American women